Mihkel Kütson (born 11 September 1971) is an Estonian conductor.

He is the principal conductor for Schleswig-Holstein Landestheater and Vanemuine Theatre (1994-2004 and since 2008).

Awards:
 2006 Deutscher Dirigentenpreis

References

External links
 

Living people
1971 births
Estonian conductors (music)